Swimming Time is the debut album by Danish rock band Nephew. Released in 2000, the album wasn't an immediate success, but upon being re-released in 2005 it sold relatively well.

Track listing

2000 albums
Nephew (band) albums